Goo Goo Dolls (also known as First Release)
is the eponymous debut studio album by American rock band Goo Goo Dolls, released on June 9, 1987 by Mercenary and Celluloid Records. All of the songs were sung by bassist Robby Takac, who was originally the band's lead vocalist. The album was recorded from late 1986 to early 1987 on a $750 budget at Trackmaster Audio in the band's hometown of Buffalo, New York. Later on, the band admitted in their 1999 VH1 Behind the Music special that the album was recorded under the influence of alcohol and drugs; Rzeznik stated, "[We had] a lot of beer, a lot of truck stop speed, a lot of pot...[I] don't remember a lot of it."

On December 15, 2013, the album was reissued by Charly Acquisitions as Made to Be Broken on digital-streaming services. The album contains the track listing in a different order from the original.

Track listing

Personnel
Robby Takac - lead vocals, bass guitar
Johnny Rzeznik - lead guitar, backing vocals
George Tutuska - drums

References

1987 debut albums
Goo Goo Dolls albums
Punk rock albums by American artists
Celluloid Records albums